This is a list of notable schools in the African country of Uganda.

Primary and secondary schools
Primary schools and secondary schools include:

A–M

Bugulumbya Secondary School
Busaana Modern Academy – Bugerere
Busoga College – Jinja District
Christian Upliftment School – Kampala
Ebony College Luwero – Luweero District
École Française Les Grands Lacs – Kampala
Entebbe Secondary School – Entebbe
Equatorial College School – Ibanda District
Gayaza High School, Gayaza – Wakiso District
International School of Uganda – Lubowa, Wakiso District
Jeressar High School – Soroti, Soroti District  
Jinja College – Jinja
Kampala International School – Bukoto, Kampala
Kawempe Muslim Secondary School – Kawempe, Kampala
Kibuli Secondary School – Kampala
Kigezi College Butobere – Kabale District
Kiira College Butiki – Jinja
King's College Budo – Buddo
Kisubi Mapeera Secondary School – Entebbe, Wakiso
Kitante Hill Secondary School – Kampala
Kololo Senior Secondary School – Kampala
Kyebambe Girls Secondary School – Fort Portal, Kabarole District
Lakeside College – Luzira
Lango College – Lira
Luwero Secondary School – Luweero
Makerere College School – Kampala
Maryhill High School – Mbarara
Masaka Secondary School – Masaka
Mbarara High School – Mbarara
Mifumi Primary School – Tororo
MK Crown Academy  – Nabweru, Wakiso District
Motherwell Junior School Mutungo
Mount St Mary's College Namagunga – Lugazi, Mukono District

N–Z

Ntinda Vocational Training Institute
Nabisunsa Girls Secondary School – Kampala
Nabumali High School – Mbale
Namilyango College – Namilyango
Namasagali College  –Kamuli District
Namirembe Hill Side High School –Wakiso District
Nkuutu Memorial Secondary School – Busesa
Ntare School – Mbarara
Nyakasura School Kabarole
Peach Primary School — Wakiso
Serere Township Secondary School – Serere District
St. Kaggwa Bushenyi High School – Bushenyi
St. Leo’s College, Kyegobe – Fort Portal
Tororo Girls School – Tororo
Trinity College Nabbingo – Nabbingo, Wakiso District
Uganda Bible Institute – Mbarara
Uganda Martyrs' Secondary School Namugongo – Wakiso Town, Central Region
Vienna College Namugongo – Kampala, Wakiso District

Tertiary schools
Nagenda International Academy of Art and Design www.niaadacademy.org

See also

 Education in Uganda
 List of vocational colleges in Uganda

References

External links
 SchoolsUganda - The number one School directory in Uganda
 Government Primary Schools at Ministry of Education and Sports (Uganda)  (PDF)
 Government Secondary Schools at Ministry of Education and Sports (Uganda)  (PDF)
School Net Uganda – Directory of Ugandan Schools 
Uganda School Directory by city at Graduates.com
 https://www.sandtonjuniorschool.com

Schools
Schools
Uganda
Uganda

Schools